Paolo Medina Etienne (born 28 May 1999) is a Mexican professional footballer who plays as a right-back for Liga I club FC Hermannstadt. He was included in The Guardian's "Next Generation 2016".

Career statistics

Club

References

1999 births
Living people
Mexican footballers
Mexico youth international footballers
Mexican expatriate footballers
Association football defenders
C.F. Monterrey players
Atlético Morelia players
Panetolikos F.C. players
UD Logroñés players
FC Hermannstadt players
Liga MX players
Super League Greece players
Primera Federación players
Liga I players
Mexican expatriate sportspeople in Spain
Expatriate footballers in Spain
Mexican expatriate sportspeople in Portugal
Expatriate footballers in Portugal
Expatriate footballers in Greece
Expatriate footballers in Romania
Footballers from Veracruz
People from Orizaba
Mexican emigrants to Spain
Mexican expatriate sportspeople in Greece
Mexican expatriate sportspeople in Romania